The 1984–85 season was the 86th season of competitive league football in the history of English football club Wolverhampton Wanderers. They played in the second tier of the English football system, the Football League Second Division.

This season would start under the ownership of the Bhatti Brothers "Allied Properties" with 1970's club legend Derek Dougan in role of Chairman, whilst Tommy Docherty was hired to lead the team as manager, succeeding Graham Hawkins who had been dismissed at the end of the previous season following relegation the top tier.

The team would suffer a further relegation finishing the 84/85 season in 22nd place during what was a difficult period from the club due to financial difficulties.

Background

Appointment of new Manager.

Scotsman, Docherty, often affectionately referred to as "The Doc" had been appointed as Manager at the Molineux based club in June 1984 following the clubs relegation from Division 1.

Docherty was a well travelled player and manager, having taken charge of six different teams during the previous seven years before his appointment at the Molineux and had already spent time in the Midlands at Wolves local rivals Aston Villa where he had been sacked in 1970 with the club bottom of Division Two. By the time he had been appointed Manager at the Wolves, Docherty had already quite an eclectic Managerial experience.

In his first managerial role in 1967/68, he famously vowed to take Rotherham United up out of Division 2, but instead performed the opposite, taking them down to Division 3. His next big spell was at Villa before moving overseas to Porto and had also enjoyed time as an international manager with his native Scotland, guiding them towards the 1974 World Cup but he was to quit this role before qualification was secured to take over as manager at Manchester United.

Docherty experienced relegation and promotion from/to the Division 1 with 'United' and his Red Devils also defeated Liverpool to win the 1977 FA Cup, only for Docherty to be sacked days later due to having an affair with the club physiotherapists wife.

Docherty nomadic path saw him manage several British based clubs following this for short periods and he would also spend time working in Australia at Sydney Olympic on two occasions. The later would be his last role prior to his appointment at Wolves.

Financial Constraints.

Docherty's task at Wolves was not to be an easy one. Wolves had been spending big during the late 1970's with a showbiz fervour. An example of this was on 8 September 1979, prior to Wolverhampton Wanderers kick off at home to Crystal Palace, the Molineux crowd were treated to the pre match celebration of new player Andy Gray being presented to them and signing a contract in front of the fans and media for a new British Transfer record of 1.5 Million Pounds. Gray would later score the winning goal for Wolves in the 1980 League Cup Final.

By the late 70's, Wolves stadium was starting to look and feel rather dated and had deteriorated from the once great stadium that had been at the forefront of modern football. The stadium where Wolves would win three league titles and would host Hungarian champions Honved under the floodlights in front of 55,00 fans in 1954, pioneering modern European Club Football.

In 1978 The Safety of Sports Grounds Act legislature had been introduced. The Act would require all sports arena to modernise their facilities in order to host events, setting a minimum legal requirement to ensure a safe environment for staff and spectators. The Molineux Street Stand that was witnes to that great night in 1954 was now a "50 year old wooden relic". It was tired and deemed not fit for purpose under the new legislature. If Wolves intended to use the stand, it needed to be rebuilt but the Chairman Harry Marshall had bigger plans than this.

After the Molineux Street Stand had been declared unsafe, Marshall began planning for a whole new stadium, at an estimated cost of £10 Million Pounds, to be part funded by incoming attendance monies, It would be the first brand new permanent football stadium in the U.K. to be constructed since the Second World War and the forward thinking design was rumoured to include the possibility of installing an enclosed roof by 1984.

"It is a bold move on our part and the design is revolutionary but we want to start something future generations will be proud of as we move into our second 100 years," Marshall stated in 1978.

The construction began with the demolition of 71 terraced houses the club had purchased to create space for the new "John Ireland Stand" and despite its completion, progress on the other stands had not begun. The project so far cost more than £2,000,000 and by 2 July 1982, the writing was on the wall with the local newspaper leading with the front page headline "Wolves have gone bust".

With the building of the new infrastructure, Wolves had surmounted debts of £2,600,000 by 1982 and new investors were needed to save the club. Fortunately three suitors put their names forward for the acquisition of the club. Local businessman Sir Jack Hayward was one interested party putting forwards a proposal and Doug Ellis, chairman of local rival Aston Villa was a second, considering purchasing the club on the cheap monopoly style  but, with Wolves less than an hour of away from going out of business, a consortium lead by Saudi Arabian brothers Mahmud and Mohammad Bhatti were selected.

Fronting the bid on behalf of the Bhatti Brothers "Allied Properties" banner was Wolves 1970's legend Derek Dougan who had played for the club during the 1972 European Cup Final. Northern Irishman Dougan would be placed in charge of the football side of operations in the role of Chairman adding more gravitas and credibility to the brothers proposal.

The Bhatti Brothers "Allied Properties" project had pinned its hopes on the redevelopment of the Molineux site and immediate surrounding area, but with more interest in the land than on the pitch, their tenure would show a genuine lack of interest and involvement in the football from the brother and sentiment towards the club soured when they failed to secure a deal and planning permissions with the local council for an area immediately behind the Molineux stadium which they had planned to develop. With little finance and a lack of enthusiasm to secure the day-to-day funding required to run the club, the rest of the stadium fell further into disrepair and with attendances dwindling.

Build up to the season

By the time Docherty arrived to take over for the 1984/85 season players like record signing Andy Gray had long left the club, and during the summer of '84, following relegation from the top flight, more players were to also leave.

Two such player were prominent attackers Mel Eves and Wayne Clarke. 27 year old Eves had made 214 Wolves starts and scored 53 goals for the club, leaving Wolves to train with Mancherster City following a ruptured achilles tendon injury which he picked up in his final Wolves match in 84, (eventually joining Sheffield United for an undisclosed fee) whilst Clarke, who had started 148 starts in the Old Gold and scored 30 goals also left for an initial £80,000 local rivals Birmingham Citywith a clause entitling Wolves to 50% of any future sale

Eves later stated his decision to leave was based upon the treatment he received after his injury and being offered a contract with reduced salary by Docherty whilst Clarke lists the nature of his monthly rolling contract and lack of investment in the squad.

Winger Tony Towner also departed that summer having been signed from Rotherham United only 12 months earlier becoming a first team regular, for £100,000. Towner famously had been on then manager Graham Hawkins pre-season shopping list, presented to Dougan, but Hawkins was made furious to find that Dougan had spent so much of the budget on him whilst he and head coach Jim Barron were out of the country. Towner would move to Charlton Athletic for just £15,000.

Perhaps most significantly was the loss of Wolves legend Kenny Hibbitt. The Midfielder, the club's second highest appearances holder (574) and tenth top scorer (114) also calling time on his Molineux career, opting for a move to Coventry City for an undisclosed fee. Asked for his thoughts on leaving the club, club legend Kenny said "Tommy Docherty came in as manager and he knew I didn't want to be around to see the club in such dire straits".

As the start of the season approached, there was yet more selection issues. John Burridge, who been first choice goalkeeper for the last two season was out of contract and making demands of the club. With the season kicking off with a home game against Sheffield United, Docherty was to make a bold decision. Rather than meet Burridge's demands, the club would bring in 17 year-old academy keeper Tim Flowers for his league debut.

The Season

Wolves season would start the season at Molineux stadium with the club hosting newly promoted Sheffield United who had finished 3rd in Division 3 the year before. Academy players Tim Flowers and Derek Ryan would make their league debuts for the club alongside new signings Alan Ainscow, Tony Evans and Tommy Langley. They were joined by an experienced defence of John Humphrey, Geoff Palmer and John Pender alongside experienced wingers/utility players Paul Butler, Ian Cartwright and Alan Dodd. The game finishing Wolves 2-2 Sheffield United with Langley and Dodd scoring in front of almost 15,000 fans.

After 5 matches Wolves were placed 10th in the table having taken two home victories against Manchester City and Charlton Athletic, a further draw at Middlesbrough and one defeat at Leeds. The players who started in opening day fixture had continued to feature across this early period of the season and would be joined by goalscorers Mark Buckland and Paul Dougherty (who had both been signed in the back end of 1984). Wolves also brought in some experience with Celtic loan signing Jim Melrose adding to the nucleus of the squad.

During the next four games however Wolves would start to slip down the table to 15th place due to a series of back to back league defeats, including a 5-1 televised thumping at Barnsley, live on ITV, with Palmer and Flowers both giving away penalties in the match.

With the early progress looking respectable, Wolves approved the sale of goalkeeper John Burridge to Sheffield United (who had been out on loan to Derby County since the start of the season) and added additions to their ranks with defender David Barnes signing from Ipswich Town for £44,000 and Kiwi midfielder Ricki Herbert joining from Docherty's old club Sydney Olympic for free.

A period of three wins in succession would see Wolves climb a couple of positions to 13th in the table before Wolves travelled to Grimsby for their second 5-1 thumping of the season, once again televised live on ITV for the nation to see.

Hoping the heavy defeats were behind them, by the end of November Wolves had picked up a further four points with a 3-3 draw at home to Wimbledon and a 2-1 victory at Craven Cottage. As December approached, Wolves sat 14th in the table, with top scorers Tony Evans (5), Tommy Langley (4) and Mark Buckland (4) having a modest total of 13 goals between them.

Wolves were misfiring but must have been confident enough with progress, allowing Geoff Palmer to move to Burnley at the end of November. Palmer, having been capped 394 times for the club, was a very experienced defender and with this departure, Wolves were allowing more experience to walk out the door. Palmer left believing he had fallen out if favour with Docherty and cited that "the club just wasn’t a nice place to be at the time, it wasn’t being run properly, and was on its knees."

From December onwards, Wolves hit an awful period of form, failing to win any of the next 19 league games including a 4-1 defeat to Notts County who were relegated along with Wolves in 83-84 and would go on to finish 21st in the league.

Pressure was mounting in January 1985 and former fan favourite and now Chairman Derek Dougan eventually resigned from his position on the board.

During January Wolves continued to haemorrhage on field experience with Alan Dodd, capped 99 times for the club, 24 of them under Docherty and having scored 3 vital goals would be released, moving on to Stoke City whilst Paul Butler who had also been a prominent feature for Docherty with 22 appearances and 2 goals was loaned to Hereford United who later made the move permanent.

Before the season ended, top scorers and first team wingers Tony Evans (5), Tommy Langley (4), Paul Dougherty (2) and Danny Crainie would also be sent out on temporary loan spells, to be replaced by two new signings (Ray Hankin and Andy King) and two incoming loanee's (Peter Eastoe and Steve Biggins). The incoming quartet would score just one goal between them that season in what seems like a bizarre decision with the only good bit of business coming with the signing of defender Peter Zelem from Chester City and the promotion of young academy player Campbell Chapman, son of head coach Sammy Chapman

On 4th May 1985, Wolves travelled to Brighton & Hove Albion and received their third 5-1 thumping of the season, this time, unfortunately for West Bromwich Albion fans was not to be televised live. During the game, goalkeeper Tim Flowers received a head injury whilst stopping a 27th minute penalty at 2-0 down. Flowers was not allowed treatment for the injury and the referee had the spot kick was retaken. Whilst this was a controversial moment. There was nothing controversial about the result with Wolves officially being relegated to the third division that day.

The following game would be the penultimate of the season and would also be Docherty final home match at Molineux. The match would be a rare success with Wolves recording their 8th win of the season in a 2-1 victory over Huddersfield Town with a diminished crowd of 4,422. Down 10,400 from the crowd that had witnessed Docherty's first game in charge just eight months previous. Scott Barrett was selected in goal for the match, replacing the injured Flowers and on the scoresheet were Alan Ainscow and Derek Ryan, two players who had made their debuts for Wolves on the opening day. The decreased attendance had been a reflection on what had been a beleaguering and battering season that the club had experienced.

The final day of the season, 11 May 1985, is a date etched in the memory of many football fans as whilst Wolves were losing 3-0 to promotion hopefuls Blackburn Rovers at Ewood Park (they would miss out on promotion by 1 point), 41.6 miles East, Bradford City were drawing 0-0 with Lincoln Town when a small fire started in Block G of Valley Parade, killing 56 spectators in what was a dark and tragic day for football.

Docherty's torrid season, which included a run of 21 games without a win had finally come to an end and he left the club in July 1985. When asked about his time at Wolves Docherty said,  "I could hardly say ‘no’ when a club as famous as that came in for me..... But it was a hopeless task really. There was no money. I wasn’t sure I’d be able to work with Derek Dougan but I accepted the challenge anyway. As for the Bhattis, I only met them twice – once when they hired me and once when they fired me."

The season was full of low points for the club with several heavy defeats, strings of losses and fan favourites departing the club but Docherty giving a club debut to a young 17 year old local lad Tim Flowers, from Kenilworth (who would be named player of the year 1985) and sticking by him all season would be remembered as a high.

But the darker side of Docherty will also be remembered, removing Assistant Manager Jim Barron and Coach Frank Upton from their roles to make way for family members. A decision which was challenged at a Employment Tribunal in favour of Barron/Upton.

Wolves would now prepare for a season in Division 3 and a search for a new manager.

Results

Football League Second Division

A total of 22 teams competed in the Football League Second Division in the 1984–85 season. Each team played every other team twice: once at their stadium, and once at the opposition's. Three points were awarded to teams for each win, one point per draw, and none for defeats. 

Final table

Source: Footballstatisticsresults.co.uk

Results by round

FA Cup

League Cup

Round 2

Wolves Progress on Aggregate Results

Round 3

Wolves Lost on Aggregate Results

Players

|-
|align="left"|||align="left"| 
|38||0||2||0||4||0||0||0||44||0||0||0||
|-
|align="left"|||align="left"| 
|4||0||0||0||0||0||0||0||4||0||0||0||
|-
|align="left"|||align="left"| 
|0||0||0||0||0||0||0||0||4||0||0||0||
|-
|align="left"|||align="left"| 
|42||0||2||0||4||0||0||0||48||0||2||0||
|-
|align="left"|||align="left"| 
|||1||2||1||3||0||0||0||||2||9||0||
|-
|align="left"|||align="left"| 
|||1||2||0||3||0||0||0||||1||1||0||
|-
|align="left"|||align="left"| 
|||2||0||0||4||1||0||0||||3||2||0||
|-
|align="left"|||align="left"| 
|||0||0||0||0||0||0||0||||0||1||0||
|-
|align="left"|||align="left"| 
|||0||0||0||1||0||0||0||||0||1||0||
|-
|align="left"|||align="left"| 
|||0||1||0||0||0||0||0||||0||0||0||
|-
|align="left"|||align="left"| 
|||0||0||0||0||0||0||0||||0||0||0||
|-
|align="left"|||align="left"| 
|||0||0||0||0||0||0||0||||0||1||0||
|-
|align="left"|||align="left"| 
|||5||2||1||2(1)||0||||0||||6||5||0||
|-
|align="left"|||align="left"| 
|||1||1||0||4||0||||0||||1||0||0||
|-
|align="left"|||align="left"| 
|||0||2||0||0||0||||0||||0||0||0||
|-
|align="left"|||align="left"| 
|||2||1||0||1||0||||0||||2||0||0||
|-
|align="left"|||align="left"| 
|||2||0 (1)||0||3||0||||0||||2||0||0||
|-
|align="left"|||align="left"| 
|||0||0||0||1(1)||0||||0||||0||2||0||
|-
|align="left"|||align="left"| 
|||1||0||0||2||0||||0||||1||0||0||
|-
|align="left"|||align="left"| 
|||0||0||0||1||0||||0||||0||0||0||
|-
|align="left"|FW||align="left"| 
|||5||2||0||4||0||0||0||||5||1||0||
|-
|align="left"|FW||align="left"| 
|||4||2||0||2(1)||0||0||0||||4||0||0||
|-
|align="left"|FW||align="left"| 
|||5||1||0||3||1||0||0||||6||0||0||
|-
|align="left"|FW||align="left"| 
|||2||2||0||1||0||0||0||||2||1||0||
|-
|align="left"|FW||align="left"| 
|||1||0||0||0||0||0||0||||1||0||0||
|-
|align="left"|FW||align="left"| 
|||2||0||0||2||2||0||0||||4||0||0||
|-
|align="left"|FW||align="left"| 
|||0||0||0||0||0||0||0||||0||0||0||
|-
|align="left"|FW||align="left"| 
|||0||0||0||0||0||0||0||||0||2||0||
|-
|align="left"|FW||align="left"| 
|||0||0||0||0||0||0||0||||0||0||0||
|-
|align="left"|FW||align="left"| 
|||0||0||0||0||0||0||0||||0||0||0||
|-
|align="left"|FW||align="left"| 
|||0||0||0||0||0||0||0||||0||0||0||
|-
|align="left"|FW||align="left"| 
|||0||0||0||0||0||0||0||||0||0||0||
|-
|}
Source: Wolverhampton Wanderers: The Complete Record

Transfers

In

Source: Wolves Complete History: Transfers A-Z

Out

Source: Wolves Complete History: Transfers A-Z

Loans in

Source: Wolves Complete History: Transfers A-Z

Loans out

Source: Wolves Complete History: Transfers A-Z

Management and coaching staff

References

1984-85
Wolverhampton Wanderers